was an old province in north-central Japan, on the shores of the Sea of Japan. It bordered on Uzen, Iwashiro, Kōzuke, Shinano, and Etchū Provinces. It corresponds today to  Niigata Prefecture, minus the island of  Sado.

Under the Engishiki classification system, Echigo was ranked as one of the 35 "superior countries" (上国) in terms of importance, and one of the 30 "far countries" (遠国) in terms of distance from the capital.

Echigo and Kōzuke Province were known as the Jōetsu region.

History
The new Echigo Province consisted of Iwafune and Nutari Districts, and was one of two border provinces of the Yamato state with the Emishi (the other being Mutsu). In 702, Echigo was given the four districts of Kubiki, Koshi, Uonuma and Kanbara from Etchū. When Japan extended its territory northward in 708, Dewa District was established under Echigo. But this district was transformed into Dewa Province in 712. Sado Province was temporarily merged with Echigo between 743 and 752. Since the division of Sado in 752, the territory of Echigo remained constant to the Meiji period.

The provincial capital of Echigo was located in Kubiki District, in what is now the city of Jōetsu, but its exact location is now unknown. Two Shinto shrines vie for the title of ichinomiya of Echigo Province: Yahiko Shrine in Yahiko, and Kota Shrine in Jōetsu.

Echigo was ruled directly by the Hōjō clan during the Kamakura period, followed by the Uesugi clan from the start of the Muromachi period to the late Sengoku period. Under the Tokugawa shogunate of the Edo period, Echigo was divided among several feudal domains. The Hokurikudō  highway passed through the province, and numerous post stations were established. The port of Niigata was also of major importance in the coastal kitamaebune trading system.

The area became a battleground during the Battle of Hokuetsu in the Boshin War of the Meiji Restoration. Following the establishment of the Meiji government, the various domains became prefectures with the abolition of the han system in 1871. These various prefectures merged to form Niigata Prefecture in 1876.

Historical districts
 Echigo Province
 Dewa District (出羽郡) - split off to become Dewa Province
 Iwafune District (岩船郡)
 Kanbara District (蒲原郡)
 Higashikanbara District (東蒲原郡)
 Kitakanbara District (北蒲原郡)
 Minamikanbara District (南蒲原郡)
 Nakakanbara District (中蒲原郡) - dissolved
 Nishikanbara District (西蒲原郡)
 Koshi District (古志郡) - formerly part of Etchū Province; now dissolved
 Kariwa District (刈羽郡) - split from Koshi District during Heian period, formerly known as Mishima District
 Santō District (三島郡) - split from Koshi District during Edo period
 Kubiki District (頸城郡) - formerly part of Etchū Province
 Higashikubiki District (東頸城郡) - dissolved
 Nakakubiki District (中頸城郡) - dissolved
 Nishikubiki District (西頸城郡) - dissolved
 Nuttari District (沼垂郡) - merged into Kanbara District (period unknown)
 Uonuma District (魚沼郡) - formerly part of Etchū Province
 Kitauonuma District (北魚沼郡) - dissolved
 Minamiuonuma District (南魚沼郡)
 Nakauonuma District (中魚沼郡)

Bakumatsu period domains

Notes

References
 Nussbaum, Louis-Frédéric and Käthe Roth. (2005).  Japan encyclopedia. Cambridge: Harvard University Press. ;  OCLC 58053128
 Papinot, Edmond. (1910). Historical and Geographic Dictionary of Japan. Tokyo: Librarie Sansaisha. OCLC 77691250

External links 

  Murdoch's map of provinces, 1903
  Echigo on "Edo 300 HTML" 

 
History of Niigata Prefecture